Harold McKee is a Traditional Unionist Voice (TUV) politician from Northern Ireland. He served as an Ulster Unionist Party (UUP) Member of the Northern Ireland Assembly (MLA) for South Down from 2016 to 2017, and currently is a councillor on Newry, Mourne and Down District Council representing the Mournes ward since 2019. He was a member of the Committee for Agriculture, Environment and Rural Affairs. He tabled 297 questions in the 2016–2017 term.

In October 2021, McKee resigned from the UUP, citing disagreements with party leader Doug Beattie over 'liberal values', saying it was "becoming very difficult to endorse a leader who is constantly to the fore promoting liberal issues".

McKee subsequently joined the Traditional Unionist Voice, and was the party's candidate for South Down in the 2022 Northern Ireland Assembly election.

He was eliminated on the 5th count.

References

 Profile, bbc.co.uk; accessed 14 May 2016.
 , aims.niassembly.gov.uk accessed 7 February 2017

Place of birth missing (living people)
1957 births
Living people
Ulster Unionist Party MLAs
Northern Ireland MLAs 2016–2017
Traditional Unionist Voice politicians